The following are the national records in athletics in the Cook Islands maintained by the Cook Island's national athletics federation: Athletics Cook Islands (ACI).

Outdoor

Key to tables:

+ = en route to a longer distance

ht = hand timing

NWI = no wind measurement

Men

Women

Indoor

Men

Women

Notes

References
General
OAA: National Records Oceania 5 November 2020 updated
Specific

External links

Cook Islands
Records
Athletics